Black Software: The Internet and Racial Justice, From the Afronet to Black Lives Matter is a 2019 American book that sets out to understand Black Lives Matter through the six-decade history of racial justice movement organizing online.

Overview 
Charlton McIlwain is an American academic and author whose expertise includes the role of race and media in politics and social life. McIlwain is Professor of media, culture, and communication and is the Vice Provost for Faculty Engagement and Development at New York University.

Dr. McIlwain is the author of multiple books, including ''Black Software: The Internet and Racial Justice, From the Afronet to Black Lives Matter, which has been widely reviewed. 
Black Software has been nominated for the MAAA Stone Book Award.

References

External Links 

 https://charltonmcilwain.com/
 https://www.nyu.edu/about/news-publications/news/2019/november/charlton-mcilwain-on-black-software.html

Black Lives Matter
Software engineering books
Social movements in the United States
Critical race theory
2019 non-fiction books
Books about race and ethnicity
Oxford University Press books